Old Arthur is an unincorporated community in Grant County, West Virginia, United States. Old Arthur lies along West Virginia Secondary Route 5.

References

Unincorporated communities in Grant County, West Virginia
Unincorporated communities in West Virginia